Charles Jerome Pratt (March 3, 1926 – August 28, 1984) was an American politician. He served as a Democratic member for the 115th district of the Florida House of Representatives from 1967 to 1970.

Pratt was born in Orlando, Florida. He attended Stetson University College of Law, where he earned a Bachelor of Laws degree in 1954. In 1967 he became the first member for the newly established 115th district of the Florida House of Representatives, serving until 1970.

Pratt was also a prosecutor and judge in Palmetto, Florida.

Pratt died in August 1984 at the L.W. Blake Memorial Hospital in Bradenton, Florida, at the age of 58. He was buried in Manasota Memorial Park.

References 

1926 births
1984 deaths
People from Orlando, Florida
Democratic Party members of the Florida House of Representatives
20th-century American politicians
Stetson University College of Law alumni
Florida state court judges
20th-century American judges
American prosecutors
Florida lawyers
Burials in Florida